The 2008 Teen Choice Awards ceremony was held on August 4, 2008, at the Gibson Amphitheatre, Universal City, California. The event was hosted by Miley Cyrus, who also performed.

Performers
 Miley Cyrus – "7 Things"
 Mariah Carey – "I'll Be Lovin' U Long Time"

Presenters
 James Marsden and Danica Patrick — presented Choice Summer Movie: Action
 Demi Lovato and Josh Duhamel — presented Choice TV Show: Drama
 Rainn Wilson — introduced Ask the Jonas Brothers
 Sophia Bush and Drake Bell — presented Choice Comedian
 Luke Ford and Vanessa Hudgens — presented Choice TV: Female Breakout Star
 Katharine McPhee and Jesse McCartney — presented Choice MySpacer
 Chad Michael Murray and Leighton Meester — presented Choice Movie Actor: Drama
 Miranda Cosgrove, Selena Gomez and JoJo — introduced the cast of The Secret Life of the American Teenager
 Minka Kelly and Zac Efron — presented Choice Summer Movie: Comedy
 Randy Jackson — introduced Mariah Carey
 Rachel Bilson and Chace Crawford — presented Choice TV Actress: Action
 Brittany Snow — presented awards to the Jonas Brothers
 Scarlett Johansson — presented the Do Something Award
 LL Cool J and Natasha Bedingfield — presented Choice Music: Male Artist
 The Cheetah Girls — presented the nominees for Choice Female Red Carpet Fashion Icon
 Thomas Dekker, Summer Glau and Brian Austin Green — presented Choice TV: Female Reality/Variety Star
 Adam G. Sevani and Jon M. Chu — introduced M&M Cru
 Jerry O'Connell and Niecy Nash — introduced David Archuleta and David Cook
 David Archuleta and David Cook — presented Choice Music: Female Artist
 Lil Mama and Jordin Sparks — presented Choice Hotties: Male and Female
 Josh Holloway and Kristen Bell — presented Choice Male Athlete
 Fergie — announced the winner of the AC/DC and M&M Cru Dance-Off

Winners and nominees
Winners are listed first and highlighted in bold text.

Movies

Television

Music

Fashion

Miscellaneous

Notes

References

2008
2008 awards in the United States
2008 in American music
2008 in Los Angeles